Harry Campbell (January 7, 1938 – May 16, 1961) was an American lightweight boxer. As an amateur he competed for the U.S. Army and was selected for the 1960 Summer Olympics, where he lost in the quarterfinal to the eventual silver medal winner Sandro Lopopolo. After the Olympics he turned professional with an amateur record of 106 wins out of 112. He won his first four professional bouts by knockout, but then lost twice to Al Medrano. In the second fight Campbell led in the first rounds, but in the tenth was knocked down twice and collapsed after the final bell. He never regained consciousness, and died shortly afterwards, despite an extensive brain surgery. At the time of his death he was studying business administration at the San Jose State University.

References

1938 births
1961 deaths
American male boxers
Boxers at the 1960 Summer Olympics
Boxers from Detroit
Deaths due to injuries sustained in boxing
Lightweight boxers
Olympic boxers of the United States
United States Army soldiers